
Stalowa Wola County is a unit of territorial administration and local government (powiat) in Subcarpathian Voivodeship, south-eastern Poland. It came into being on January 1, 1999, as a result of the Polish local government reforms passed in 1998.

Neighbouring counties
Stalowa Wola County is bordered by Kraśnik County to the north, Janów Lubelski County to the east, Nisko County to the south-east, Kolbuszowa County to the south, and Tarnobrzeg County and Sandomierz County to the west.

Administrative division
The county is subdivided into six gminas (one urban and five rural). These are listed in the following table, in descending order of population.

References

 
Stalowa Wola